There are 80 mammal species in Georgia, of which one is critically endangered, two are endangered, ten are vulnerable, and two are near threatened. All mammals in Georgia are in subclass Theria and infraclass Eutheria, being placental mammals.

The following tags are used to highlight each species' conservation status as assessed by the International Union for Conservation of Nature:

Order: Rodentia (rodents)

Rodents make up the largest order of mammals, with over 40% of mammalian species. They have two incisors in the upper and lower jaw which grow continually and must be kept short by gnawing.
Suborder: Hystricognathi
Family: Hystricidae (Old World porcupines)
Genus: Hystrix
 Indian porcupine, H. indica 
Suborder: Sciurognathi
Family: Sciuridae (squirrels)
Subfamily: Sciurinae
Tribe: Sciurini
Genus: Sciurus
 Caucasian squirrel, S. anomalus 
Subfamily: Xerinae
Tribe: Marmotini
Genus: Spermophilus
 Caucasian mountain ground squirrel, S. musicus 
 Little ground squirrel, Spermophilus pygmaeus
Family: Gliridae (dormice)
Subfamily: Leithiinae
Genus: Dryomys
 Forest dormouse, Dryomys nitedula
Subfamily: Glirinae
Genus: Glis
 European edible dormouse, Glis glis
Family: Dipodidae (jerboas)
Subfamily: Allactaginae
Genus: Allactaga
 Small five-toed jerboa, Allactaga elater
Subfamily: Sicistinae
Genus: Sicista
 Northern birch mouse, Sicista betulina
 Kazbeg birch mouse, Sicista kazbegica DD
Family: Spalacidae
Subfamily: Spalacinae
Genus: Nannospalax
 Nehring's blind mole-rat, Nannospalax nehringi
Family: Cricetidae
Subfamily: Cricetinae
Genus: Cricetus
 European hamster, C. cricetus  presence uncertain
Genus: Mesocricetus
 Turkish hamster, Mesocricetus brandti
Subfamily: Arvicolinae
Genus: Chionomys
 Caucasian snow vole, Chionomys gud
 Snow vole, Chionomys nivalis
 Robert's snow vole, Chionomys roberti
Genus: Ellobius
 Transcaucasian mole vole, Ellobius lutescens
Genus: Microtus
 Altai vole, Microtus obscurus
Genus: Prometheomys
 Long-clawed mole vole, Prometheomys schaposchnikowi
Family: Muridae (mice, rats, voles, gerbils, hamsters, etc.)
Subfamily: Murinae
Genus: Apodemus
 Striped field mouse, Apodemus agrarius
 Yellow-breasted field mouse, Apodemus fulvipectus
 Broad-toothed field mouse, Apodemus mystacinus
 Black Sea field mouse, Apodemus ponticus
 Ural field mouse, Apodemus uralensis
Genus: Micromys
 Eurasian harvest mouse, Micromys minutus
Genus: Rattus
Brown rat, R. norvegicus  introduced

Order: Lagomorpha (lagomorphs)

The lagomorphs comprise two families, Leporidae (hares and rabbits), and Ochotonidae (pikas). Though they can resemble rodents, and were classified as a superfamily in that order until the early 20th century, they have since been considered a separate order. They differ from rodents in a number of physical characteristics, such as having four incisors in the upper jaw rather than two.

Family: Leporidae
Genus: Lepus
European hare, L. europaeus

Order: Erinaceomorpha (hedgehogs and gymnures)

The order Erinaceomorpha contains a single family, Erinaceidae, which comprise the hedgehogs and gymnures. The hedgehogs are easily recognised by their spines while gymnures look more like large rats.

Family: Erinaceidae (hedgehogs)
Subfamily: Erinaceinae
Genus: Erinaceus
 Southern white-breasted hedgehog, E. concolor

Order: Soricomorpha (shrews, moles, and solenodons)

The "shrew-forms" are insectivorous mammals. The shrews and solenodons closely resemble mice while the moles are stout-bodied burrowers.
Family: Soricidae (shrews)
Subfamily: Crocidurinae
Genus: Crocidura
 Bicolored shrew, C. leucodon
Lesser white-toothed shrew, C. suaveolens 
Genus: Suncus
 Etruscan shrew, Suncus etruscus LC
Subfamily: Soricinae
Tribe: Nectogalini
Genus: Neomys
 Transcaucasian water shrew, Neomys schelkovnikovi
Tribe: Soricini
Genus: Sorex
 Eurasian pygmy shrew, Sorex minutus
 Radde's shrew, Sorex raddei
 Caucasian pygmy shrew, Sorex volnuchini

Order: Chiroptera (bats)

The bats' most distinguishing feature is that their forelimbs are developed as wings, making them the only mammals capable of flight. Bat species account for about 20% of all mammals.
Family: Vespertilionidae
Subfamily: Myotinae
Genus: Myotis
Bechstein's bat, M. bechsteini 
Lesser mouse-eared bat, M. blythii 
Geoffroy's bat, M. emarginatus 
Natterer's bat, M. nattereri 
Subfamily: Vespertilioninae
Genus: Barbastella
Western barbastelle, B. barbastellus 
 Asian barbastelle, B. leucomelas LC
Genus: Eptesicus
 Northern bat, E. nilssoni LC
Genus: Hypsugo
Savi's pipistrelle, H. savii 
Genus: Nyctalus
Greater noctule bat, N. lasiopterus 
Lesser noctule, N. leisleri 
Genus: Pipistrellus
 Kuhl's pipistrelle, P. kuhlii LC
Nathusius' pipistrelle, P. nathusii 
 Common pipistrelle, P. pipistrellus LC
Genus: Plecotus
Brown long-eared bat, P. auritus 
 Grey long-eared bat, P. austriacus LC
Subfamily: Miniopterinae
Genus: Miniopterus
Common bent-wing bat, M. schreibersii 
Family: Rhinolophidae
Subfamily: Rhinolophinae
Genus: Rhinolophus
Mediterranean horseshoe bat, R. euryale 
Greater horseshoe bat, R. ferrumequinum 
Lesser horseshoe bat, R. hipposideros 
Mehely's horseshoe bat, R. mehelyi

Order: Cetacea (whales)

The order Cetacea includes whales, dolphins and porpoises. They are the mammals most fully adapted to aquatic life with a spindle-shaped nearly hairless body, protected by a thick layer of blubber, and forelimbs and tail modified to provide propulsion underwater.

Suborder: Mysticeti
Family: Balaenopteridae (rorquals)
Genus: Balaenoptera
 Common minke whale, Balaenoptera acutorostrata LC (vagrant)
Suborder: Odontoceti
Superfamily: Platanistoidea
Family: Phocoenidae
Genus: Phocoena
 Harbour porpoise, Phocoena phocoena VU
Family: Delphinidae (marine dolphins)
Genus: Delphinus
 Short-beaked common dolphin, Delphinus delphis
Genus: Tursiops
 Common bottlenose dolphin, Tursiops truncatus DD

Order: Carnivora (carnivorans)

There are over 260 species of carnivorans, the majority of which feed primarily on meat. They have a characteristic skull shape and dentition. 
Suborder: Feliformia
Family: Felidae (cats)
Subfamily: Felinae
Genus: Felis
Jungle cat, F. chaus 
European wildcat, F. silvestris 
 Caucasian wildcat, F. s. caucasica
Genus: Lynx
 Eurasian lynx, L. lynx 
 Caucasian lynx, L. l. dinniki
Subfamily: Pantherinae
Genus: Panthera
 Leopard, P. pardus  presence uncertain
 P. p. tulliana  presence uncertain
Family: Hyaenidae (hyaenas)
Genus: Hyaena
Striped hyena, H. hyaena 
Suborder: Caniformia
Family: Canidae (dogs, foxes)
Genus: Canis
Golden jackal, C. aureus 
European jackal, C. a. moreoticus
Gray wolf, C. lupus 
 Steppe wolf, C. l. campestris
Genus: Vulpes
Red fox, V. vulpes 
Family: Ursidae (bears)
Genus: Ursus
Brown bear, U. arctos 
 Family: Procyonidae
 Genus: Procyon
 Common raccoon, P. lotor  introduced
Family: Mustelidae (mustelids)
Genus: Lutra
Eurasian otter, L. lutra 
Genus: Martes
Beech marten, M. foina 
European pine marten, M. martes 
Genus: Meles
Caucasian badger, M. canescens 
Genus: Mustela
Stoat, M. erminea 
Steppe polecat, M. eversmannii 
Least weasel, M. nivalis 
Genus: Vormela
Marbled polecat, V. peregusna

Order: Artiodactyla (even-toed ungulates)

The even-toed ungulates are ungulates whose weight is borne about equally by the third and fourth toes, rather than mostly or entirely by the third as in perissodactyls. There are about 220 artiodactyl species, including many that are of great economic importance to humans.
Family: Bovidae (cattle, antelope, sheep, goats)
Subfamily: Antilopinae
Genus: Gazella
Goitered gazelle, G. subgutturosa  reintroduced 
Subfamily: Caprinae
Genus: Capra
Wild goat, C. aegagrus 
West Caucasian tur, C. caucasica 
East Caucasian tur, C. cylindricornis 
Genus: Rupicapra
Chamois, R. rupicapra 
Family: Cervidae (deer)
Subfamily: Capreolinae
Genus: Capreolus
Roe deer, C. capreolus 
Subfamily: Cervinae
Genus: Cervus
Red deer, C. elaphus 
Family: Suidae (pigs)
Subfamily: Suinae
Genus: Sus
Wild boar, S. scrofa

Locally extinct 
The following species are locally extinct in the country:
Cheetah, Acinonyx jubatus 
Moose, Alces alces
Wild horse, Equus ferus
Onager, Equus hemionus
Mediterranean monk seal, Monachus monachus
European mink, Mustela lutreola
Lion, Panthera leo
Tiger, Panthera tigris

See also
List of chordate orders
Lists of mammals by region
Mammal classification

References

External links

Georgia
Mammals
Mammals
Georgia
Georgia